The Census Information Center program is part of the U.S. Census Bureau's data dissemination network.

History 
The Census Information Center (CIC) Program was started in 1988 to improve access to census data by minority groups and economically disadvantaged segments of the population, who have been traditionally undercounted in censuses and surveys. The original five participating organizations were: The National Urban League, The National Council of La Raza, the William C. Velasquez Institute, the Asian and Pacific Islander American Health Forum and the Americans for Indian Opportunity (replaced by the Native America Public Telecommunications). For more than a decade, from 1988 to April 2000, the CIC program did not grow beyond the original 5 organizations and languished due to a lack of funding and support.

In April 2000, the Census Bureau renewed its commitment to close the minority and economic gap in data access by expanding the CIC Program to include 54 additional organizations representing under-served communities, bringing the number of Program participants to 59 organizations. Funding was made available for training, data products, postage and staff to ensure the success of the Program. 

Between 2000 and 2005 15 organizations left the program for various reasons.  In September 2006, the Census Bureau admitted an additional 13 organizations.

Participants 
 Arab American Institute
 Asian American Federation of New York
 Asian American Studies Center/National CAPACD, University of California, Los Angeles
 Asian American Studies Program, University of Maryland
 Asian and Pacific Islander American Health Forum
 Asian Pacific American Legal Center of Southern California
 ASIAN, Inc.
 Bayamon Central University
 California Indian Manpower Consortium
 Capital Area Council of Governments
 Center for Applied Research, Norfolk State University
 Center for Border Health Research
 Center for Business and Economic Research, Louisiana State University in Shreveport
 Center on Pacific Studies Interwork Institute, San Diego State University
 Child Welfare League of America
 Children's Defense Fund
 Chinese American Voters Education Committee
 Community Service Council of Greater Tulsa
 Dillard University
 Dubois Bunche Center for Public Policy, Medgar Evers College - City University of New York
 First Alaskans Institute
 Florida Agricultural & Mechanical University
 Goodwill Industries International, Inc.
 Howard University
 Indian Affairs Department, State of New Mexico
 Instituto de Investigaciones Interdisciplinarias, University of Puerto Rico at Cayey
 Inter-University Program for Latino Research, Notre Dame University
 Joint Center for Political and Economic Studies
 Korean American Coalition
 Latin American Chamber of Commerce
 Leadership Conference on Civil Rights
 LeMoyne-Owen College
 Meharry Medical College
 Metro Chicago Information Center
 Mississippi Urban Research Center, Jackson State University
 NAACP
 National Asian Pacific Center on Aging
 National Congress of American Indians
 National Congress of Vietnamese Americans
 National Council of La Raza
 National Institute for Latino Policy
 National Urban League Policy Institute
 Neighborhoods Resource Center
 Northeast Council of Governments
 Organization of Chinese Americans
 Papa Ola Lokahi
 Piast Institute
 Rural Community Assistance Partnerships, Inc.
 SER-Jobs for Progress National, Inc.
 Sitting Bull College
 Special Service for Groups
 Spelman College
 The Metropolitan Center, Florida International University
 The Navajo Nation
 The University of Texas-Pan American
 United States Hispanic Leadership Institute
 Vanderbilt University
 William C. Velasquez Institute

External links 
 Census Information Center Program
 Asian, Inc. (San Francisco, CA)

Government agencies established in 1988
United States Census Bureau